Manfred Haake (born 9 November 1943) is a German rower who represented East Germany. He competed at the 1968 Summer Olympics in Mexico City in the men's double sculls with Uli Schmied where they came fifth.

References

1943 births
Living people
People from Spree-Neiße
People from the Province of Brandenburg
German male rowers
Sportspeople from Brandenburg
Olympic rowers of East Germany
Rowers at the 1968 Summer Olympics
World Rowing Championships medalists for East Germany
European Rowing Championships medalists
20th-century German people
21st-century German people